Eduard Averyanovich Ludyansky (29 September 1931 – 1 November 1995) was a Russian neurologist, acupuncturist and apitherapist, Doctor of Medical Sciences and Doctor of the Highest Category. "Guide to Apitherapy" (1994) is his most famous book.

He graduated with honors from the Izhevsk State Medical Academy in 1954.
In 1958 he studied in the Kazan State Medical Academy.

Since 1962, he heads the Department of Neurology at the Vologda Regional Hospital.
From 1962 to 1992, Dr. Ludyansky held the position of Chief Neurologist of the Vologda Oblast.
In 1975, he defended his Candidat thesis.

Since 1990, he was a Member of the Board of the All-Russian Society of Neurologists.
In 1995, he defended his doctoral thesis about apitherapy in neurology.

He received the Russian Award for Excellence in Health Care.

Monographs  
Ludyansky E. A. Apitherapy. Vologda, 1994. 462 p. (in Russian)

External links
Эдуард Аверьянович Лудянский (1931–1995) / Лебедев В.А., Онищук Е.В., Сергеева Т.А., Тиханкин И.А. // Лечение заболеваний нервной системы, 2011.

Russian neurologists
Acupuncturists
Apitherapists
1931 births
1995 deaths